The history of anime in the United States began in 1961, when Magic Boy and The Tale of the White Serpent became the first and second anime to receive documented releases in the country. Anime has since found success with a growing audience in the region, with Astro Boy often being noted as the first anime to receive widespread syndication, especially in the United States. Additionally, anime's growth in popularity in the US during the 1990s, commonly referred to as the "anime boom," is credited with much of anime's enduring relevance to popular culture outside Japan. While anime has commonly been distributed illegally by pirates and fansubbers in the past via bootleg releases, especially in the 1990s and early 2000s, and continues to be on torrent sites and bootleg streaming avenues, the popularity of such practices has drastically decreased due to the advent of legal streaming services such as Crunchyroll which simulcast new anime series, often within a few hours of their domestic release.

1980s

Basic cable provided a frequent broadcast outlet for juvenile-targeted anime during the 1980s, in particular Nickelodeon and Christian Broadcasting Network Cable (now Freeform). In the early 1980s, CBN aired an English dub of the Christian-themed anime series Superbook and The Flying House, as well as the girls' drama series Honey Honey and an uncut, Hawaiian-dubbed version of Go Nagai's Super Robot series Mazinger Z (aired as part of a Japan-focused public-affairs show). In the late 1980s, after the station had been renamed The Family Channel, it would also air dubs of Wowser and Nippon Animation's World Masterpiece Theater version of Swiss Family Robinson Nickelodeon aired anime such as Mysterious Cities of Gold and Belle and Sebastian, and anime also later formed a major component of the network's Nick Jr. block, including Maple Town, Adventures of the Little Koala, Noozles, Maya the Bee, The Littl' Bits, and Grimm's Fairy Tale Classics. Premium channels also aired anime on occasion: HBO broadcast numerous anime television series based on Western literature, including Gisaburo Sugii's Jack and the Beanstalk and the World Masterpiece Theater versions of Little Women and Tom Sawyer, and Osamu Tezuka's Unico features aired on The Disney Channel.

In 1981, Roger Corman wrote an English dub of the first Galaxy Express movie Bonjour Galaxy Express 999, shortened the name to Galaxy Express, and aired it on television. The dub changed some of the original Japanese names into more recognizable American names, like changing Tetsuro to Joey and Harlock to Warlock. Corman also edited out 30 minutes of footage, and Antonia Levi, the author of "Samurai from Outer Space" said that his dub was "Highly edited and too damaged to watch". Faring equally poorly was Corman's 1984 edit of Hayao Miyazaki's Nausicaa of the Valley of the Wind, released theatrically as Warriors of the Wind; this dub is said to have so displeased Miyazaki that he would insist that all future American releases of his work be unedited.

In 1983, Stern Electronics released a Dragon's Lair clone known as Cliff Hanger, which contained footage from the Lupin III films The Castle of Cagliostro and The Mystery of Mamo. As Cliff Hanger predated any proper Western release of Lupin media or Hayao Miyazaki films, and the popularization of anime in the West generally, it became notable for first exposing many Americans to anime.

In the mid-1980s super robot and space opera anime were very popular. Series such as Voltron, Transformers, and Robotech were successful in ratings and also commercial successes through selling merchandise. Mazinger Z fared less well, airing in syndication in 1985 in a heavily edited dubbed version (not the Toei-commissioned dub previously broadcast on CBN) titled TranZor Z.

Faring even less well was the first American release of Akira Toriyama's Dragon Ball in 1989. Harmony Gold produced a partial dub of the first five TV episodes and two movies (The Curse of the Blood Rubies and The Mystical Adventure) which were edited into an 80-minute film. The dubs were syndicated across America to independent television stations such as WPSG Philly 57 in Philadelphia, Pennsylvania, and WGPR-TV in Detroit, Michigan, but failed to find an audience.

In 1988 and 1989, the OVA series Bubblegum Crisis was one of the earliest fan subs and AnimEigo later got the license to the OVAs and dub the series.

In 1988, Streamline Pictures became one of the first companies dedicated solely to anime dubs, most notably dubbed versions of Twilight of the Cockroaches and three more Miyazaki films: My Neighbor Totoro and Kiki's Delivery Service, both released initially as in-flight entertainment for Japan Airlines passengers traveling from North America to Japan, and Castle in the Sky. The Totoro dub would eventually be released theatrically and commercially in the United States in 1993, and all three movies would later be redubbed by the Walt Disney Company as part of the company's deal with Studio Ghibli.

Lensman: Secret of The Lens was first dubbed by Harmony Gold in 1988, and re-dubbed by Streamline Pictures in 1990; some of the voice actors voiced characters in both dubs. The film was based on the Lensman novels by E. E. Smith. The Harmony Gold dub used remastered music and some music tracks came out of their previous movies Robotech II: The Sentinels and Robotech The Movie: The Untold Story, while the Streamline Pictures dub used the original Japanese soundtrack.

In 1988, AnimEigo just started after Streamline Pictures and had the slogan "Anime in your way!". Their first anime they dubbed was Metal Skin Panic MADOX-01, renamed MADOX-01 for the UK release in 1995, was only released on to VHS in 1989, due to content not suitable for television or theatrical release. They also dubbed the 4 episode OVA Vampire Princess Miyu in the same year, which was later adapted into a 26-episode TV series by Tokyopop, later by Maiden Japan in 1997.

In the mid to late 80s, anime films such as Akira, My Neighbor Totoro, Warriors of the Wind, Castle in the Sky, Kiki's Delivery Service, Metal Skin Panic MADOX-01 were dubbed by companies including MGM, Streamline Pictures, Harmony Gold, Fox, New World Pictures, and AnimEigo. Even though these films were not very successful at the time, due in part to limited release, they got positive reviews from critics, and Akira found a cult following. Most of these films received higher-quality dubs later on.

1990s
The 1990s was the period in which anime reached mainstream popularity in the U.S. market and the terms "anime" and "manga" became commonly known, replacing "Japanimation". Companies such as FUNimation Productions, Bandai Entertainment, 4Kids Entertainment, Central Park Media, Media Blasters, Saban Entertainment, Viz Video, Pioneer LDC, and ADV Films began licensing anime in the United States.

The first anime in the US in the 1990s, Dragon Warrior (also known as Dragon Quest), created by Akira Toriyama and based on the video game series, aired in 1989 in Japan; in 1990, it was broadcast in the US by Saban Entertainment. The show was unsuccessful in the US and was not released on home video.

Saban Entertainment later dubbed the 1990 anime Kyatto Ninden Teyandee, changed the name to Samurai Pizza Cats, and aired it in syndication in 1991. In 2002, Saban Entertainment's rights to the show expired, then Discotek Media obtained the rights and still owns the rights to the series to this day.

Viz which was already successful with its manga translation of Rumiko Takahashi's Ranma ½, bought the rights to the anime and released it via direct-to-video starting in 1993. Ranma ½ enjoyed success in the VHS market and was the first anime title in the 1990s to have this level of success and one of the first titles to be recognized as an "anime". Viz also began publishing a magazine called Animerica in the 1990s which featured manga as well as articles on Japanese culture, fashion, manga, anime, and video games, this helped spread the otaku subculture to Americans. Fansubs were also popular during this period.

In 1995, the original Dragon Ball, now assisted by Funimation and other collaborators, finally managed to air to an American audience for one season in early morning syndication. The show was cancelled after one season due to low ratings.

Anime saw greater success among American audiences when DiC (then owned by Disney) and Funimation (with the help of Saban Entertainment and Ocean Studios) licensed Sailor Moon (1995) and Dragon Ball Z (1996) respectively and both were televised in the U.S. through early morning syndication. Since the two anime were very successful internationally, they were purchased to capitalize on the success of Japan-influenced superhero shows like Mighty Morphin Power Rangers (the very popular Americanized version of the tokusatsu series Super Sentai) and Teenage Mutant Ninja Turtles.

In the summer of 1998, Cartoon Network which had an action-themed evening block named Toonami began airing Sailor Moon and Dragon Ball Z both became overwhelmingly successful with younger audiences (being that they were aired in the evening hours which children were home) and as a result both got revived: receiving new dubs with significantly less editing being that these episodes were on cable television and with the recent inception of television rating system (both were rated TV-Y7-FV), the standards were relaxed. Voltron, Robotech and Ronin Warriors also enjoyed renewed success on Toonami. Toonami would continue to air anime and is credited with beginning the era of the anime boom in the United States in the late 1990s and early 2000s.

In 1996, one of the most influential and controversial popular series was Neon Genesis Evangelion. It was released on VHS uncut by ADV Films, and Manga Entertainment released the films End of Evangelion and Evangelion: Death and Rebirth in the U.S. in 2002. Evangelion grew to have a large fan base in the United States.

In 1998, Pokémon was introduced to America and it became a commercial success through its merchandising (trading cards, VHS, toys, video games, etc.). Digimon was introduced in 1999; although it was a success, it did not reach the same level of popularity as Pokémon.

Syfy (formerly Sci-Fi Channel) also aired many experimental, avant-garde, action, horror, and science fiction anime films and series during the 1990s during the late night and early morning hours until their removal from programming in 2011. It aired films including Ghost in the Shell, Ninja Scroll, Akira, Street Fighter II: The Animated Movie, and Urusei Yatsura 2: Beautiful Dreamer are among the films that have aired. Series such as Casshan: Robot Hunter, Record of Lodoss War, Iria: Zeiram the Animation and Fist of the North Star. In Northern California, KTEH-TV in San Jose became well known locally for being one of the few PBS outlets to air anime, in both dubbed and subtitled versions.

In 1998, Disney's Miramax released the anime film Princess Mononoke in the U.S. theatrically, though it was not a great success at the box office (it did much better on DVD releases) it began the relationship between Disney and Studio Ghibli to distribute the latter's films in the U.S.

2000s

In the 2000s even after the popular series Dragon Ball Z and Sailor Moon ended their runs, Toonami still continued to air popular anime such as Mobile Suit Gundam Wing, which is credited for single-handedly popularizing the Gundam franchise in the west, Dragon Ball, Dragon Ball GT, Rurouni Kenshin,Yu Yu Hakusho, .hack, Cardcaptors, Tenchi Muyo!, Tenchi Universe, Tenchi in Tokyo, The 08th MS Team, One Piece, Mobile Suit Gundam SEED, Astro Boy, SD Gundam, Cyborg 009, IGPX, Bobobo-bo Bo-bobo, Outlaw Star, Hamtaro and Naruto. Naruto was very successful on Toonami and remains of the most popular anime titles in the U.S. In 2008, Toonami was discontinued and anime began airing exclusively on Adult Swim, the late-night counterpart to Cartoon Network.

The block Adult Swim began airing on Cartoon Network in 2001, its first anime title aired was Cowboy Bebop. Cowboy Bebop was very successful and remains the longest aired anime series on Adult Swim. Adult Swim also aired series including uncut episodes of Fullmetal Alchemist, InuYasha, Outlaw Star, Pilot Candidate, Paranoia Agent, Samurai Champloo, Death Note, s-CRY-ed, Eureka Seven, Kekkaishi, Durarara!!, Ghost in the Shell: Stand Alone Complex, FLCL, Neon Genesis Evangelion, Case Closed, Lupin III, Blue Gender, Code Geass, Bleach, Blood+, Trinity Blood, Shin Chan, Wolf's Rain, Moribito: Guardian of the Spirit and Trigun. Adult Swim mostly airs anime under the title "Action" even though Shin Chan and Super Milk Chan are comedies. Adult Swim became so successful over the years that Turner Broadcasting split it from Cartoon Network and is now ranked as an independent network.

Due to the popularity of Dragon Ball Z, Funimation would continue to dominate the anime distribution in the United States and continued licensing several popular titles such as Yu Yu Hakusho, Case Closed, Blue Gender, Fruits Basket, Black Cat, Ouran High School Host Club, Kodocha, One Piece, Kenichi: The Mightiest Disciple, Trinity Blood, Fullmetal Alchemist, Tsubasa: Reservoir Chronicle and Shin Chan and launched its own channel, Funimation Channel, to exclusively carry most of its titles. Funimation would also rescue rights to titles when if its licensor discontinued, such as the case with ADV Films (which closed in 2008) and Geneon (which closed in 2007).

After the success of Pokémon in the late 1990s, 4Kids Entertainment continue to license anime titles and target them towards children such as the Yu-Gi-Oh! franchise, Sonic X, Magical DoReMi, Mew Mew Power, Shaman King, Kirby: Right Back at Ya!, Dinosaur King and Ultimate Muscle. However 4Kids was met with much controversy for its use of "Americanization" and heavy editing of content, particularly with its dub of Yu-Gi-Oh! and One Piece.

In 2002, Spirited Away was released through Disney theatrically and was successful enough to be the first anime film to be nominated for and win an Academy Award.

2010s

In 2010, Dragon Ball Z Kai premiered on Nicktoons and became a hit success for the network, Nicktoons also aired the original Dragon Ball Z films and Dragon Ball GT. Starting in March 2013, Yu-Gi-Oh! and one of its continuing series, Yu-Gi-Oh! Zexal started to air on the network. Digimon Adventure and Digimon Adventure 02 also started to air on the network starting June 2013 and one of its continuing series, Digimon Fusion moved to the network on October 13, 2013, from Nickelodeon after three episodes, mostly due to Nickelodeon's failed attempt at marketing the anime before it premiered September 7, 2013.

Fansub sites of popular anime have been popular yet controversial in the U.S. Many are criticized for losing anime licensors' revenue and have been blamed for the cause of many companies going out of business. Section23, Bandai, Viz, TV Tokyo, and Funimation have tried to limit these efforts by sending cease and desist letters or blocking out content on many sites. The production of English dubs of anime, in general, has decreased and many distributors are switching to the subtitle-only market such as Sentai Filmworks, Aniplex Of America, and NIS America.

In 2012, Bandai folded its Bandai Entertainment anime licensing department in the United States. Eventually studio Sunrise (owned by Bandai Visual) made deals with Funimation and Sentai Filmworks to license and republish Sunrise titles formerly licensed by Bandai Entertainment. In 2012, 4Kids Entertainment filed for bankruptcy protection and sold off the rights to the Yu-Gi-Oh! franchise back to Konami, and the remaining licenses went to Saban Brands.

In early 2012, Fullmetal Alchemist: The Sacred Star of Milos was released in over 100 theaters throughout North America.

The Secret World of Arrietty was released theatrically in 2012, and was only a moderate box office success in the United States, despite being one of the highest-grossing films of 2012 (Number 50 in the Worldwide box office).

In 2012, due to popular requests on Twitter, Reddit, and Facebook: the Toonami block was revived and began airing on Adult Swim, replacing Adult Swim Action. Similar to Midnight Run, it is now targeted to the young adult demographic with little to no editing of content. On May 16, 2014, Viz Media acquired the license for the original Sailor Moon series (formerly owned by DiC/Cloverway, Inc in the 1990s and early 2000s) and the new 2014 anime series, Pretty Guardian Sailor Moon: Crystal, which it was premiered on July 5, 2014. In May 2014, the Walt Disney Company acquired the broadcasting rights for the 2005 series based on the Fujiko Fujio manga Doraemon, and began airing the program on Disney XD on July 7 of that year, marking the first-ever release of the Doraemon franchise in the United States.

In December 2015, the Funimation Channel was replaced by Toku, after Funimation finished its alliance with Olympusat, being the only 24/7 television channel dedicated to broadcasting anime series and films, as well as live-action Asian films.

2020s

Due to the COVID-19 pandemic, many anime works have either been delayed or canceled until further notice.

See also
History of anime

References

Anime
History of animation in the United States